Sellwood-Moreland is a neighborhood on a bluff overlooking the Willamette River in Southeast Portland, Oregon, bordering Brooklyn to the north, Eastmoreland to the east, and the city of Milwaukie to the south. The neighborhood is linked to Southwest Portland across the Willamette River by the Sellwood Bridge, the southernmost of Portland's bridges.

History
Sellwood originated as an independent city and as a rival of nearby early Portland on the  Donation Land Claim of Reverend John Sellwood, who sold the claim in 1882 to the Sellwood Real Estate Company. The town of Sellwood was incorporated by the Oregon Legislative Assembly on February 25, 1889.   It was annexed by Portland in 1893.

Features

Sellwood has an amusement park named Oaks Park along the river. A bike trail next to railroad tracks above the river is accessible from Sellwood, and links Milwaukie and downtown Portland. The Oaks Bottom Wildlife Refuge was established in 1988 and has allowed the preservation and protection of numerous species. Walking trails go through the park, traversing woods, meadow and marshland.

Milwaukie Avenue and SE 13th Avenue are the locations of many restaurants, Moreland Theater, specialty retail and neighborhood stores, upscale antique shops, a middle school, and other stores.

References

External links 
 PDF map
 Guide to Sellwood-Moreland Neighborhood - PortlandNeighborhood.com's Sellwood-Moreland page
 The Sellwood Bee - Sellwood's local paper
Sellwood-Moreland Street Tree Inventory Report

 
1889 establishments in Oregon
Populated places established in 1889
1893 disestablishments in Oregon
Former cities in Oregon
Neighborhoods in Portland, Oregon